Browns Lake or Brown's Lake may refer to:

United States

 Browns Lake in Faulkner County, Arkansas
 Browns Lake in Miller County, Arkansas
Browns Lake (Idaho), a glacial lake in Elmore County, Idaho
Browns Lake, a lake in Scott County, Minnesota
Browns Lake (Washington), a lake in Washington
Browns Lake, Wisconsin, a census-designated place in Racine County, Wisconsin

Other places
 Brownes Lake / Kroweratwari, also spelt Browns Lake, part of the Mount Gambier (volcano) complex, South Australia

See also
Brown's Lake Bog, a nature preserve in Wayne County, Ohio
Brown Lake (disambiguation)